George Gene Gustines (born 1971) is a journalist who is the managing editor of T, a magazine of The New York Times.

As a journalist, he has written for the "New Jersey", Circuits (technology), "Escapes", "The City", "Television" and "Arts and Leisure" weekly sections, and the daily National, "Culture" and "Business" sections of the Times.

Gustines joined the staff of The New York Times in 1991.

Personal life
Gustines is the son of Aida and Jorge Gustines. A longtime resident of New York City, Gustines lives with his partner, Steven Schack.

Partial bibliography

Reviews
 "Books of the Times: A Bittersweet Tale of Father and Daughter." (Review of Alison Bechdel's Fun Home: A Family Tragicomic) The New York Times, 26 June 2006.

Off-Off-Broadway plays
1997
 With Steve Schack. Papered Over. Producers Club, 1997 [self-produced].

Graphic novels edited
 Bernatovech, Rich and Vecchio, Luciano. Sentinels, Book 1: Footsteps. Drumfish Productions, 2003. 
 Bernatovech, Rich and Vecchio, Luciano. Sentinels, Book 2: Masks. Drumfish Productions.

Notes

1971 births
Living people
21st-century American dramatists and playwrights
American male journalists
American magazine editors
Comic book editors
The New York Times editors
The New York Times writers
Place of birth missing (living people)
American LGBT journalists
American LGBT dramatists and playwrights
American male dramatists and playwrights
21st-century American male writers
21st-century American non-fiction writers